Year 1161 (MCLXI) was a common year starting on Sunday (link will display the full calendar) of the Julian calendar.

Events 
 By place 

 Europe 
 February 3 – Battle of Oslo: King Inge I (the Hunchback) is defeated and killed, while fighting the forces of Haakon II (the Broadshouldered). He is succeeded by Haakon with the 5-year-old Magnus V as co-ruler, but not without challenges to his sovereignty.
 Magnus II (Henriksson), pretender to the Swedish throne, is murdered by Charles VII (or Karl), who becomes king of Sweden (until 1167).
 An Almoravid offensive against the Kingdom of Portugal reaches the city of Almada (located on the Tagus River).
 Géza II of Hungary and the envoys of Pope Alexander III conclude the Concordat of 1161.

 Asia 
 Jin–Song Wars: The Battle of Tangdao (November 16) and Battle of Caishi (November 26–27) on the Yangtze River, between the Jin Dynasty and the Song Dynasty in China, result in two pivotal Song naval victories.
 December 15 – Wanyan Liang, Chinese prince of Hailing, is assassinated while on campaign. He is succeeded by Emperor Shi Zong of the Jin Dynasty (until 1189).

 England 
 Spring – Theobald of Bec, archbishop of Canterbury dies after an illness. King Henry II is informed and he expresses the wish to have his friend Thomas Becket elected as his successor.
 Bartholomew Iscanus is elected and consecrated as bishop of Exeter (until 1184).

 By topic 

 Religion 
 The Cross of Euphrosyne, commissioned by Euphrosyne of Polotsk, is created by craftsman Lazar Bohsa (The cross later went missing during World War II, and has not been recovered).

Births 
 February 22 – Innocent III, pope of the Catholic Church (d. 1216)
 September 20 – Takakura, emperor of Japan (d. 1181)
 Alfonso Téllez de Meneses, Spanish nobleman (d. 1230)
 Baldwin IV (the Leper), king of Jerusalem (d. 1185)
 Beatrice of Albon, duchess of Burgundy (d. 1228)
 Belgutei, half-brother of Genghis Khan (d. 1271)
 Börte, wife of Genghis Khan (approximate date)
 Constance, duchess of Brittany (approximate date)
 Da'ud Abu al-Fadl, Ayyubid physician (d. 1242)
 Eleanor of England, queen of Castile (d. 1214)
 Guðmundur Arason, Icelandic bishop (d. 1237)
 Sancho (or Sanche), Spanish nobleman (d. 1223)
 Sasaki Yoshikiyo, Japanese nobleman (d. 1242)
 Satō Tadanobu, Japanese samurai (d. 1186)
 Tsangpa Gyare, Tibetan Buddhist leader (d. 1211)

Deaths 
 February 3 – Inge I (the Hunchback), king of Norway (b. 1135)
 April 18 – Theobald of Bec, archbishop of Canterbury (b. 1090)
 May 12 – Fergus of Galloway, Scottish nobleman
 June 14 – Qin Zong, Chinese emperor (b. 1100)
 September 10 – Tala'i ibn Ruzzik, Fatimid vizier
 September 11 – Melisende, queen of Jerusalem (b. 1105)
 October 12 – Henry V, duke of Carinthia (House of Sponheim)
 October 28 – Imar of Tusculum, French abbot and bishop
 November 21 – William III, count of Nevers and Auxerre 
 November 23 – Adam of Ebrach, German monk and abbot
 December 15 – Wanyan Liang, Chinese emperor (b. 1122)
 Akarius Fitz Bardolph, English nobleman and knight
 Hu Hong, Chinese scholar and philosopher (b. 1105)
 Magnus II (Henriksson), king of Sweden (b. 1130)
 Rechung Dorje Drakpa, Tibetan Buddhist leader
 Roger IV, duke of Apulia and Calabria (b. 1152)

References